XHAF-FM is a radio station on 99.5 FM in Celaya, Guanajuato, Mexico. XHAF carries the @FM contemporary hit radio format from Grupo Radiorama.

History

XHAF began as XEAF-AM, receiving its concession on June 28, 1979. It was owned by Enrique Bermúdez Olvera and broadcast as a daytimer on 1580 kHz. It was sold in the 1990s and migrated to FM in 2012.

In 2015, XHAF moved to a new transmitter facility. The previous one was in Ojo Seco.

In 2017, XHAF changed from Éxtasis Digital to @FM.

References

1979 establishments in Mexico
Contemporary hit radio stations in Mexico
Grupo Radiorama
Radio stations established in 1979
Radio stations in Guanajuato
Spanish-language radio stations